Virginia Kravarioti (born April 27, 1984 in Athens) is a Greek sailor. She won the bronze medal in the women's Yngling class with Sofia Bekatorou and Sofia Papadopoulou at the 2008 Summer Olympics in Beijing, People's Republic of China.

References

External links
 
 
 

1984 births
Living people
Greek female sailors (sport)
Sailors (sport) from Athens
Sailors at the 2004 Summer Olympics – Europe
Sailors at the 2008 Summer Olympics – Yngling
Olympic bronze medalists for Greece
Olympic sailors of Greece
Olympic medalists in sailing
Medalists at the 2008 Summer Olympics